Carlo Alberto Chiesa (1922–1960) was an Italian screenwriter, film editor and director. In 1945 he edited Luchino Visconti's docu-drama Days of Glory. He spent much of his later career directing commercials, his one feature film as director was the 1951 comedy The Two Sergeants (1951).

Selected filmography

Director
 The Two Sergeants (1951)

Editor
 Days of Glory (1945)

Screenwriter
 Songs in the Streets (1950)
 The Two Sergeants (1951)
 The Devil's Cavaliers (1959)

References

External links 
 

1922 births
1960 deaths
20th-century Italian screenwriters
Italian film editors
Italian film directors
Film people from Turin
Italian male screenwriters
Road incident deaths in Italy
20th-century Italian male writers